This is a list of free-standing sculptures by Cyrus Dallin in Massachusetts. A collection of his sculpture and painting can also be seen at the Cyrus Dallin Art Museum in Arlington, Massachusetts. Additional works can be found at the Springville Museum of Art in Springville, Utah.

This list contains sculptures in spaces that might be accessed by a member of the public. Some of them may require requesting access. There may be additional sculptures in the public domain and as they are identified, they will be added to this list.

References

External links 

 https://www.bbns.org/
 https://crls.cpsd.us/
 https://dallin.org/
 https://www.mfa.org/
 https://newtonfreelibrary.net
 https://www.robbinslibrary.org/
 http://www.smofa.
 Cyrus Edwin Dallin

Sculpture
Public art
Works by Cyrus Edwin Dallin
Sculptures